Pennsylvania State Senate District 33 includes all of Adams County and Franklin County. It is currently represented by Republican Doug Mastriano.

Senators since 1933

References

Pennsylvania Senate districts
Government of Adams County, Pennsylvania
Government of Cumberland County, Pennsylvania
Government of Franklin County, Pennsylvania
Government of York County, Pennsylvania